is a former baseball player from Japan. He primarily paid for Orix Blue Wave in the Japan Pacific League.

References

1965 births
Living people
Baseball people from Fukuoka Prefecture
Japanese baseball players
Nippon Professional Baseball infielders
Fukuoka Daiei Hawks players
Orix BlueWave players
Yakult Swallows players
Japanese baseball coaches
Nippon Professional Baseball coaches